Jacek Namieśnik (10 December 1949 Mogilno – 14 April 2019 Gdańsk) was a Polish chemist, full professor of Gdańsk University of Technology. He was head of Analytical Department (1995–2019), dean of Faculty of Chemistry (1996–2002, 2005–2012), rector of Gdańsk University of Technology since 1 September 2016 until his death.

Biography 
In 1967 he graduated from the First High School in Inowrocław and started his studies at the Faculty of Chemistry of Gdańsk University of Technology. After graduating in 1972, he began his scientific career at this university, earning his degree in chemistry in 1978. The subject of his dissertation, conducted under the supervision of prof. Edmund Kozłowski was "The Determination of the total content of carbon and the content of organic carbon from volatile air pollutants". In 1985, on the basis of the dissertation "Concentration of volatile organic air pollutants", he obtained a degree of habilitated doctor, and the title of professor of chemical sciences received on 15 January 1996.

In 1990–1996 he was a Deputy Dean for Education of the Faculty of Chemistry of Gdańsk University of Technology, and in 1996–2002 and again 2005–2012 Dean of this Faculty. Beginning in 1995 he was also the head of the Department of Analytical Chemistry, which has been awarded the Center of Excellence. Member of the Senate of the PG (since 1990) and head of the Doctoral Studies at the Faculty of Chemistry, Gdańsk University of Technology.

Elected to rector of Gdańsk University of Technology in 2016–2020

Simultaneously with the duties of the Rector of the Gdańsk University of Technology prof. Jacek Namieśnik held the function of Vice-President of the Conference of Rectors of Polish Technical Universities (KRPUT) from 2016 until his death in 2019.

Teaching subjects
 Analytical Chemistry

Lecturer
Jacek Namieśnik was the director of Doctoral Studies at the Faculty of Chemistry. The supervisor of 65 PhD thesis and 2 PhD thesis co-supervisor

Research interests 
 Environmental Chemistry
 Analytical Chemistry
 Green Analytical Chemistry

Science achievements 
Author and co-author of 1000 of publications listed on the Institute for Scientific Information list (cited 10657 times), numerous publications and 13 patents of the h-index h=50, ΣIF = 2339,537. He was also an active member of several editorial boards of scientific and scientific-technical magazines, and of advice and scientific committees. Supervisor or Co-supervisor of 65 PhD thesis (completed).

Awards 
Jacek Namieśnik has won numerous awards for outstanding scientific achievements.
 1993 –  Gold Cross of Merit
 1995 –  Medal of the National Education Commission
 1998 –  Order of Polonia Restituta - Knight's Cross
 2005 –  Order of Polonia Restituta - Officer's Cross
 2016 –  Order of Polonia Restituta - Commander's Cross
 2017 – Prime Minister Award (individual)
 2019 –  Order of Polonia Restituta - Commander's Cross with Star (post mortem)

He was also awarded by numerous bodies and councils governmental, regional and scientific. Since 2007 he has been Professor honoris causa of the University of Bucharest. He also has honoris causa doctorates from Gdańsk Medical University and the Military University of Technology in Warsaw.

Membership of societies 
He was also very active outside of the home institution, as is evidenced by the large number of functions he performed in various academic and professional associations:
 Polish Chemical Society (Polskie Towarzystwo Chemiczne)
 Romanian Society of Analytical Chemistry
 International Union of Pure and Applied Chemistry – IUPAC (fellow since 2000)
 Steering Committee International Society of Environmental Analytical Chemistry – ISEAC (since 2002)
 Polish Central Commission for Academic Degrees and Titles (2007-2016)
 Committee on Analytical Chemistry of the Polish Academy of Sciences (PAS) since 1996, chairman of the Committee on Analytical Chemistry (2007-2015)
 Member of the Committee on Marine Research of the Polish Academy of Sciences (PAS) since 2007
 Member of Scientific Board Institute of Oceanology (PAS) since 2008
 Institute of Nuclear Chemistry and Technology (IChTiJ) since 2015
 European Academy of Sciences and Arts (EASA) since 2017

Redactor 
 Journal of Chromatography A (IF = 4,531)
 Critical Reviews in Environmental Sciences and Technology (Associate Editor) (IF = 4,541) 
 Environmental Research (IF = 3,951) 
 Critical Reviews in Analytical Chemistry (IF = 3,902) 
 The Science of the Total Environment (IF = 3,163)
 Acta Chromatographica (IF = 0,760)
 Polish Journal of Environmental Studies (IF = 0,508)
 International Journal of Occupational Safety and Ergonomics (IF = 0,312)
 MethodsX
 Analityka (Wydawnictwo Malamut)
 Chemistry and Chemical Technology (Lviv, Ukraine)
 Aparatura Badawcza i Dydaktyczna

Selected books 
  (1988, red. )
  (1992, co-authors: Jerzy Łukasiak, Zygmunt Jamrógiewicz)
  (1995, red.,   Gdańsk, 1995)
  (1995, co-authors: Jerzy Łukasiak and Zygmunt Jamrógiewicz)
  (2000, co-authors: Zygmunt Jamrógiewicz, Michał Pilarczyk and L. Torres)
  (2007, with Piotr Konieczka)
 Quality assurance and quality control in the analytical chemical laboratory: a practical approach (2009, with Piotr Konieczka)
 Analytical Measurements in Aquatic Environments (2009, co-author: Piotr Szefer)

References

External links 
 Prof. Jacek Namieśnik
 Jacek Namieśnik citations in Google scholar
 Jacek Namieśnik in Researchgate.net
 Jacek Namieśnik in Google scholar

1949 births
2019 deaths
Gdańsk University of Technology alumni
Academic staff of the Gdańsk University of Technology
Polish chemists
Polish inventors